Turnaround may refer to:

 Turnaround (filmmaking), an arrangement in which the rights to a project are sold by one studio to another
 Turnaround (refining), an event wherein an entire process unit is taken offstream for revamp or renewal
 Turnaround (road), a type of traffic junction
 Turnaround management, a management strategy to regenerate a company's performance
 Turnaround, in scheduling, the total time between submission of a process and its completion
 Turnaround, the process of or time needed for loading, unloading, and servicing an aircraft, see aircraft ground handling

Books, films, sculpture
 Turnaround: Crisis, Leadership, and the Olympic Games, a 2004 book by Mitt Romney
 Turnaround: How America's Top Cop Reversed the Crime Epidemic, a 1998 memoir by William Bratton
 Turnaround, a 1987 film by Ola Solum

Music 
 Turnaround (music), in jazz or blues, a transitional passage at the end of a section

Albums
 Turnaround (Stan Rogers album), 1978
 Turnaround (Joanne Brackeen album), 1992
 Turnaround (Westlife album), 2003
 Turnaround Tour, a 2004 tour by Westlife in support of the album
 The Turnaround!, a 1965 album by Hank Mobley
 Turnaround, an album by Katrina and the Waves

Songs
 Turnaround, a Nirvana cover of the song "Turn Around" by Devo, a B-side from the single "Whip It", featured in Incesticide
 Turnaround, a song by Ornette Coleman from Tomorrow Is the Question!
 Turnaround, a song by Kisschasy from Seizures
 Turnaround, a song by Stan Rogers from the title of the 1978 album

See also
 
 Turn Around (disambiguation)